Defensor Sporting will take part of the 2012–13 season in the Uruguayan Primera División. They will also take part in the Copa Libertadores.

Pre-Season and Friendlies

Transfer Window

In 

Total Spending:  € 0M

Out 

Total Income:  $ 500K

Net Income:  $ 500K

Squad

First Team 

TBA

Out On Loan 

TBA

Top Scorers 

TBA

Top Assists 

TBA

Disciplinary Record 

TBA

Injuries During The Season 

Last Updated: 15 May 2012

Competitions

Overview 

TBA

Primera División

League table 

TBA

Copa Libertadores 

Defensor Sporting seasons
Defensor